Fredrik Samuelsson (born 14 October 1980) is a Swedish football manager and former footballer who played as a defender. He is the head coach of the Hammarby IF U19 team.

Manager career

Assyriska FF
After retiring in 2013, Samuelsson began his coaching career with the U19 team at Assyriska FF

Samuelsson was appointed as new assistant manager for Assyriska FF in 2014 under manager Azrudin Valentić. Valentić got fired in May 2014, and Samuelsson took over as a caretaker, until the new manager, Sören Åkeby, arrived two days after.

Azrudin Valentić arrived as manager once again in September 2014, but decided to leave the club in October 2015, and Samuelsson was once again appointed as caretaker until the new year. Then Tor-Arne Fredheim was hired as head coach, but got fired May 2016 and this time, Assyriska FF decided to hire Samuelsson as the head coach instead of as caretaker. Samuelsson was fired on 10 October 2016.

Hammarby IF
Samuelsson was hired as U17 coach at Hammarby IF starting from 1 January 2017.

References

External links
 

1980 births
Living people
Association football defenders
Swedish footballers
Assyriska FF players
Örebro SK players
Allsvenskan players
Superettan players
Hammarby Fotboll non-playing staff